The 1919 Bavarian state election was held on 12 January and 2 February 1919 to elect the 180 members of the Landtag of Bavaria.

Results

References 

Bavaria
1919
January 1919 events in Europe
February 1919 events in Europe